Mollenkopf is a surname. Notable people with the surname include:

Jack Mollenkopf (1905–1975), American football coach
John Mollenkopf (born 1946), American political scientist and sociologist
Steve Mollenkopf, CEO of Qualcomm Inc.
Cameron Mollenkopf,  CEO of Monsterinkmusicrecords American singer producer Writer model/film.
Clothing Ambassador 
COAST dropped 09/2019
Multi-million